Graeme or Graham Watson may refer to:

 Graham Watson (born 1956), British politician
 Graeme Watson (cricketer) (1945-2020), Australian professional cricketer and Australian footballer
 Graham Watson (footballer, born 1949), English footballer (Doncaster Rovers, Cambridge United)
 Graham Watson (footballer, born 1970), Scottish footballer (Aberdeen FC)
 Graeme Watson (footballer) (born 1986), Scottish footballer (Airdrie United)
 Graham Watson (motorsport), New Zealand-born Italian Formula One engineer